Tarlow Creek is a stream in the U.S. state of Mississippi.

Tarlow is a name derived from the Choctaw language purported to mean "palmetto". Variant names are "Parlow Creek" and "Sunflower Creek".

References

Rivers of Mississippi
Rivers of Newton County, Mississippi
Mississippi placenames of Native American origin